Ghost is a 1998 Iranian drama film written and directed by Hossein Shahabi (Persian: حسین شهابی)

Starring
 Bahar Karimzadeh
 Amir Mandavi
 Rahim Fallah
 Karim Nobakht
 Mohammad Baghban
 Vahid Azadi
 Karim Novin

Crew
 cinematography: Hamid Angaji
 Sound Recorder: Souroosh Kevan
 Costume Designer: Nina Tabrizi
 Makeup designer: Mohammad Baghban
 Music: Hossein Shahabi
 Production manager: karim Nobakht
 producer: Hossein Shahabi
 produced in Baran film house iran 1998

References

1997 films
Iranian drama films
Films directed by Hossein Shahabi